A. V. C. College of Engineering is a self-financing college for engineering education located in the headquarters of the district of Mayiladuthurai within the Indian state of Tamil Nadu.

History

A.V.C. College of Engineering was started in the year 1996. The founding father, Sri S. Ramalingam Pillai sowed the seeds of A.V. Charities in 1806 in memory of his beloved son Thiru Velayutham pillai. A.V. Charities began its educational services by starting the A.V.C. (Autonomous) college in 1955, extended their horizon to A.V.C Polytechnic in 1983 and in 1996 by opening the Engineering college. A.V. Charities serve as Beacon light in the field of education to the innumerable youth, with rural background.

A.V.C College of Engineering is a pioneer institution and first self financing college in then Mayiladuthurai District. The College of Engineering has been approved by All India Council for Technical Education (AICTE) and is an ISO 9001:2015 certified institution.

Affiliations
A. V. C. College of Engineering is currently affiliated with Anna University of Technology in Chennai.

References

External links

 Courses Offered

Engineering colleges in Tamil Nadu
Colleges affiliated to Anna University
Educational institutions established in 1996
1996 establishments in Tamil Nadu